Argentine is a citizen of Argentina.

Argentine, Argentinian and Argentinean may also refer to:

Places 
Argentine, Kansas, United States
Argentine, Michigan, United States
Argentine, Savoie, a commune in France
Argentine Township, Michigan, United States
Argentine Township, Fall River County, South Dakota, United States
Argentine (Paris Métro)
L'Argentine, a mountain in the Alps

Other uses 
Silver and other similar metals
Argentine (fish), a fish in the family Argentinidae or the herring smelts
Spatalia argentina or Argentine, a moth in the family Notodontidae
The Argentine, the subtitle for part one of the 2008 biopic Che about Che Guevara starring Benicio del Toro

See also 
 Argentina (disambiguation)
 Argentino (disambiguation)
 Culture of Argentina
 
 
 

Language and nationality disambiguation pages